Samantha "Sam" Davies (born 23 August 1974 in Portsmouth) is an English yachtswoman.

Personal life

Davies went to school at Portsmouth High School and received a degree in mechanical engineering from St John's College, Cambridge. She now lives in Kerlin (Trégunc), Brittany, France with fellow offshore sailor Romain Attanasio who she is engaged to and with whom she has a son Ruben.

Biography

Samantha Davies came into the limelight with her 2008-2009 single-handed world circumnavigation in the Vendée Globe race, where she placed fourth. She was the third to cross the finish line, but owed a time allowance of 50 Hr to competitor Marc Guillemot, who crossed the line 48:40' after her. The time allowance was applied following both competitors' diversion to assist injured skipper Yann Eliès, but Marc Guillemot benefited from a larger handicap because of his forward position in the race. In 2009 she was awarded Yachtsman of the year by the yachting journalist association

During the 2020-2021 Vendee Globe she was forced to retire on day 26 with keel damage following collision with unidentified floating object she sailed to Cape Town where the damage was fully accessed and repaired and she continued outside the race and arrived on here circumnavigation completing it in a time of 109d 23h 40m.

Record of achievement

References

External links
 
 
 
 

1974 births
English sailors
English female sailors (sport)
Living people
Sportspeople from Portsmouth
Alumni of St John's College, Cambridge
People educated at Portsmouth High School (Southsea)
Female explorers
English explorers
Volvo Ocean Race sailors
IMOCA 60 class sailors
Volvo 65 class sailors
Vendée Globe finishers
British Vendee Globe sailors
2008 Vendee Globe sailors
2012 Vendee Globe sailors
2020 Vendee Globe sailors